Ed O'Ross (born Edward Orss; July 5, 1949) is an American actor. Some of his prominent roles are as Itchy in Dick Tracy, Colonel Perry in Universal Soldier, Lt. Touchdown in Full Metal Jacket, ruthless Georgian mobster Viktor Rostavili in Red Heat, police detective Cliff Willis in The Hidden, and for his role on the TV Shows ‘’Six Feet Under’’ (2001-2005) and Shark (2006-2008).

Early life and education
O'Ross was born Edward Orss on July 5, 1949 in Pittsburgh, Pennsylvania , of Czechoslovak descent. 

He graduated from Munhall High School, where he was a star baseball player, in 1964. He subsequently attended Point Park College and Carnegie Tech (which became Carnegie Mellon University, where he studied with Ralph Lewando at Carnegie Tech.

Prior to becoming an actor, O'Ross was a boxer, winning a Golden Gloves amateur championship in 1964. He was also a minor league baseball player. He even auditioned for two Major League Baseball teams (the Pittsburgh Pirates and St. Louis Cardinals) but was not selected.

He studied acting over several years, under Stella Adler and Uta Hagen, among others.

Career
He has appeared in many films and has played several Russian characters including [in fact Georgian] villain Viktor Rostavili / Viktor Rosta in Walter Hill's action film Red Heat, Nikolai, one of Ruth Fisher's love interests on the HBO series Six Feet Under and Leo, a sandwich shop owner on Curb Your Enthusiasm and playing the voice of Agent K on Men in Black: The Series for 1st season only.

Other films of his include Dreams of Gold: The Mel Fisher Story, The Pope of Greenwich Village, The Cotton Club, Full Metal Jacket, Lethal Weapon, The Hidden, Action Jackson, Another 48 Hrs., Universal Soldier, Dick Tracy, Hoodlum, Curious George, The Harsh Life of Veronica Lambert and Sorority Party Massacre.

Guest television appearances include Stingray, Boston Legal, Seinfeld, Walker, Texas Ranger, CSI: NY, The Outsiders and Moonlighting (in the episode "Brother, Can You Spare A Blonde?").

O'Ross has occasionally done voice work, namely in the video game Judgment as Shigeru Kajihira.

Personal life
O'Ross resides in New York City and Los Angeles.

References

External links
 
 

1949 births
Living people
20th-century American male actors
21st-century American male actors
American male film actors
American male television actors
American male voice actors
American people of Czechoslovak descent
Male actors from Florida